Li Bingjie (born 3 March 2002) is a Chinese swimmer. She is the world record holder in the short course 400 metre freestyle. She is also the Asian record holder in the long course 400 metre freestyle as well as the short course 1500 metre freestyle. She is the 2021 World Short Course champion in the 400 metre freestyle and 800 metre freestyle. At the 2020 Summer Olympics, she won a gold medal in the 4×200 metre freestyle relay and a bronze medal in the 400 metre freestyle.

Career
At the 2016 Junior Pan Pacific Swimming Championships, in Hawaii, United States, Bingjie won gold medals in the 200 metre freestyle with a 1:58.23, 400 metre freestyle with a 4:07.52, and the 800 metre freestyle with a 8:28.12.

Bingjie competed at the 2017 World Aquatics Championships, winning two silver medals and a bronze. In 2018, she competed in the World Short Course Championships in Hangzhou and won a bronze medal in the Women's 400 meter freestyle. She added a gold medal in the women's 4 x 200 meter relay, swimming the first leg. In the 2018 Asian Games in Jakarta, Li won her first gold title in the 200m Women's Freestyle  with a  time of 1:56.74.

2021–2022
In 2021, Bingjie won the bronze medal in the 400 metre freestyle at the 2020 Summer Olympics with a time of 4:01.08, finishing 4.39 seconds behind gold medalist Ariarne Titmus of Australia. She was also a gold medalist in the 4×200 metre freestyle relay, splitting a 1:55.30 for the anchor leg of the relay to help set a new world record of 7:40.33. Later in the year, at the 2021 World Short Course Championships in December, she won the world title and gold medal in the 800 metre freestyle with a Championships record time of 8:02.90, which was 0.51 seconds faster than the former record set seven years earlier by Mireia Belmonte of Spain. The following day, she won the gold medal and world title in the 400 metre freestyle as well, finishing over two seconds ahead of silver medalist Summer McIntosh of Canada with a time 3:55.83.

On 27 October 2022, at the 2022 Chinese National Swimming Championships, Bingjie won the gold medal in the short course 400 metre freestyle with a world record time of 3:51.30, lowering the former record of 3:53.92 set by Ariarne Titmus in 2018 by 2.62 seconds. The following day, she set a new Asian record and Chinese record in the 1500 metre freestyle with a time of 15:41.80 and a new Chinese record in the 200 metre freestyle with a time of 1:51.25.

Originally entered to compete in four individual events at the 2022 World Short Course Championships, the 200 metre freestyle, 400 metre freestyle, 800 metre freestyle, and the first-ever female 1500 metre freestyle at a World Short Course Championships, Bingjie was unable to compete after arriving in Melbourne, Australia due to contracting COVID-19.

International championships (50 m)

International championships (25 m)

Personal bests

Long course (50-meter pool)

Short course (25-meter pool)

Swimming World Cup circuits
The following medals Bingjie has won at Swimming World Cup circuits.

World records

Long course (50-meter pool)

Short course (25-meter pool)

References

External links
 

2002 births
Living people
Asian Games medalists in swimming
Asian Games gold medalists for China
Asian Games silver medalists for China
Chinese female freestyle swimmers
Medalists at the 2018 Asian Games
Swimmers at the 2020 Summer Olympics
Medalists at the 2020 Summer Olympics
Olympic gold medalists for China
Olympic gold medalists in swimming
Olympic bronze medalists for China
Olympic bronze medalists in swimming
Swimmers at the 2018 Asian Games
World Aquatics Championships medalists in swimming
Medalists at the FINA World Swimming Championships (25 m)
21st-century Chinese women